State Route 142 (SR 142) is a primary state highway in the U.S. state of Virginia.  The state highway runs  from U.S. Route 1 (US 1) and US 460 Business near Petersburg to the highway's crossing of a CSX rail line in the independent city of Petersburg.

Route description

SR 142 begins at an intersection with US 1 and US 460 Business (Boydton Plank Road) just south of the U.S. Highways' interchange with Interstate 85 (I-85, Richmond–Petersburg Turnpike) in eastern Dinwiddie County.  The state highway heads east as two-lane undivided Simpson Road, which heads east parallel to I-85 through a sparsely-populated area and passes the remains of Fort Gregg.  East of the old Confederate fort, SR 142 enters the city of Petersburg and becomes named Boydton Plank Road.  The state highway enters a residential area shortly before crossing over I-85 and intersecting Squirrel Level Road, which has a diamond interchange with I-85 to the south.  SR 142 intersects Halifax Road and the highway's name changes to Halifax Street shortly before the highway reaches its eastern terminus at its bridge over CSX's North End Subdivision.  Halifax Street continues northeast as an unnumbered street toward Old Towne Petersburg.

Major intersections

References

External links

Virginia Highways Project: VA 142

142
State Route 142
State Route 142